Tasmidella is a lichen genus in the family Ramalinaceae. Circumscribed by Gintaras Kantvilas, Josef Hafellner, and John A. Elix in 1999, it contains the single species Tasmidella variabilis, found in Tasmania. It is distinguished from the closely related genus Megalaria by having simple spores with a layered wall.

References

Lecanorales
Lichen genera
Monotypic Lecanorales genera
Taxa named by Josef Hafellner
Taxa named by Gintaras Kantvilas
Taxa named by John Alan Elix
Taxa described in 1999